Charles Graham Spoonhour (June 23, 1939 – February 1, 2012) was an American basketball coach.

Spoonhour was born in Mulberry, Kansas, attended high school in Rogers, Arkansas, and received an education degree from the University of the Ozarks. He spent seven seasons as a high school basketball coach, then fourteen seasons bouncing between Division I assistant coaching positions and junior college head coaching positions. This included a four-year stretch from 1969 to 1973 as an assistant coach on the staff of head coach Bill Thomas at then-Division II Southwest Missouri State (now Missouri State).

Ten years later, Spoonhour was on the staff of Nebraska coach Moe Iba, when he was hired as head coach of SMS for the 1983–84 season, a year after the Bears had moved up to Division I. He led the Bears to five NCAA tournament appearances in a six-season stretch from 1987 to 1992. His best season was in 1986–87 when the Bears won the Mid-Continent Conference with a 13–1 mark and finished 28–6. Behind future NBA point guard Winston Garland, they made it to the second round of the 1987 NCAA tournament as a #13-seed, beating fourth-seeded Clemson, 65–60, before losing to fifth-seeded Kansas, 67–63.

After the 1991–92 season, he went to Saint Louis University, where he led the Billikens to three NCAA tournament appearances in seven seasons.  In 2001, he went to the University of Nevada, Las Vegas, where he retired from coaching following the 2003-04 season.

Spoonhour was known for wearing sweaters and slacks while coaching.

In 2010, he was diagnosed with idiopathic pulmonary fibrosis, and placed on the recipient list for a lung transplant. He received the lung transplant at Duke University Medical Center in August 2010, and was said to be in good condition, according to the St. Louis Post-Dispatch. He spent the next six months recuperating at Duke.

On February 1, 2012, Spoonhour died at the age of 72.

On April 6, 2012, Spoonhour's son, Jay Spoonhour, was named the head men's basketball coach at Eastern Illinois University.

Head coaching record

College

References

1939 births
2012 deaths
American men's basketball coaches
American men's basketball players
Basketball coaches from Kansas
Basketball players from Kansas
High school basketball coaches in the United States
Missouri State Bears basketball coaches
Moberly Greyhounds men's basketball coaches
Oklahoma Sooners men's basketball coaches
Lung transplant recipients
Ozarks Eagles men's basketball players
People from Chapel Hill, North Carolina
People from Crawford County, Kansas
People from Rogers, Arkansas
Saint Louis Billikens men's basketball coaches
UNLV Runnin' Rebels basketball coaches
University of Arkansas alumni